David Logan (April 5, 1824 – March 26, 1874) was an American attorney and politician in the territory of and later state of Oregon. A native of Illinois, he moved to Oregon in 1850 where he served in the Oregon Territorial Legislature and in the Oregon Constitutional Convention. A founder of the Oregon Republican Party, he also served as mayor of Portland.

Early life
David Logan was born in the state of Kentucky on April 5, 1824. The family later moved to the town of Springfield, Illinois. His father, Stephen T. Logan, practiced law as a partner with Abraham Lincoln in Springfield. David Logan studied law in Springfield under his father and Lincoln passing the bar in 1844 in Sangamon County. An anti-Democrat and Whig politically, Logan was to become a partner with Lincoln and his father in their practice before his drinking led to a falling out with his father. Due to this falling out, Logan's father sent him to join the army and fight in the Mexican–American War. David Logan also briefly moved to California. After Logan returned from the war, his father sent him to Oregon.

In 1850, Logan arrived in what was then the Oregon Territory and set up a law practice in Lafayette. He moved to Portland soon after and continued practicing law. The next year he ran for representative office in the Oregon Territorial Legislature for Yamhill County, but lost to Matthew P. Deady. Logan and Deady would have a long-running feud, Logan's drunkenness would continue to plague him, and further troubles included accusations of the rape of a Native American girl. On January 20, 1852, he represented the United States in a customs dispute with the Hudson's Bay Company at a court in Olympia, which was still part of the Oregon Territory at that time.

Political career
In June 1854, Logan was elected to the Oregon Territorial Legislature to represent Washington County, which at that time included Portland and part of what later that year became Multnomah County. In 1857, he was elected to represent Multnomah County at the Oregon Constitutional Convention. Held from August to September in Salem, Logan was on the Judicial Department Committee. Though he voted against the adoption of the Oregon Constitution, the document was approved and became effective upon statehood on February 14, 1859. He also helped found the Oregon Republican Party.

Upon statehood, Logan stood as the new Republican Party's candidate for the state's seat in the House of Representatives. He lost in both 1859 and 1860 to Lansing Stout. Logan was elected as the Mayor of Portland on April 6, 1863, and served until April 1864 when Henry Failing was elected to the office. In 1868, he ran for Oregon's seat in Congress as the Republican nominee, losing to Joseph Showalter Smith.

Later years
In 1862, he married Mary Porter Waldo; they had no children. Logan entered a partnership with Erasmus D. Shattuck in 1857, and remained a partner until 1874. In 1871, he partly retired to a farm in Yamhill County. On March 26, 1874, David Logan died in Yamhill County at the age of 49. He was called the "greatest jury lawyer of his time".

References

External links

 Reports of Cases Decided in the Circuit and District Courts of the United States for the Ninth Circuit

Mayors of Portland, Oregon
People from Kentucky
Members of the Oregon Territorial Legislature
Members of the Oregon Constitutional Convention
Oregon lawyers
1824 births
1874 deaths
Politicians from Springfield, Illinois
American military personnel of the Mexican–American War
People from Lafayette, Oregon
19th-century American politicians
19th-century American lawyers